The 1993 DFB-Pokal Final decided the winner of the 1992–93 DFB-Pokal, the 50th season of Germany's premier knockout football cup competition. It was played on 12 June 1993 at the Olympiastadion in Berlin. Hertha BSC's second team, playing in the third division, made it to the final against Bayer Leverkusen, making it the first and only time a reserve side has made it to the final, as second teams have since been disallowed from entering the competition. Leverkusen won the match 1–0 to claim their first cup title.

Route to the final
The DFB-Pokal began with 83 teams in a single-elimination knockout cup competition. There were a total of five rounds leading up to the final. Teams were drawn against each other, and the winner after 90 minutes would advance. If still tied, 30 minutes of extra time was played. If the score was still level, a penalty shoot-out was used to determine the winner.

Note: In all results below, the score of the finalist is given first (H: home; A: away).

Match

Details

References

External links
 Match report at kicker.de 
 Match report at WorldFootball.net
 Match report at Fussballdaten.de 

Bayer 04 Leverkusen matches
Hertha BSC matches
1992–93 in German football cups
1993
June 1993 sports events in Europe
1993 in Berlin
Football competitions in Berlin